The 2020 Lone Star Le Mans was an endurance sportscar racing event held on 23 February 2020, as the fifth round of the 2019–20 FIA World Endurance Championship. This marked the return of the FIA WEC to the Circuit of the Americas for the first time since 2017, and the inaugural running of the race under the banner of Lone Star Le Mans, which had previously been utilised by the WeatherTech SportsCar Championship for races run at COTA, while WEC races occurring on the same weekend had been run as the 6 Hours of Circuit of the Americas.

Background 
The provisional calendar for the 2019–20 FIA World Endurance Championship was unveiled at the 2018 6 Hours of Silverstone, featuring eight races, on five continents, starting at Silverstone in September 2019 with a four-hour race, and ending with the 24 Hours of Le Mans in June 2020. The calendar saw the events from the previous seasons carried over, while bringing back the rounds held at the Bahrain International Circuit, and the Autódromo José Carlos Pace, which had last been held in 2017, and in 2014 respectively. The 6 Hours of São Paulo would serve as the 5th round, and was planned to be held on 1 February 2020.

On 10 November 2019, FIA WEC boss Gerard Neveu issued a warning to teams regarding the 6 Hours of São Paulo, stating that the promoter of the event, N/Duduch Motorsports, was facing issues in meeting its contractual recruitments, with some of the issues being of financial nature, with Neveu stating that the championship would make a decision on the event before December 2019. At the time, several venues were considered to replace Interlagos, including Kyalami, the Autódromo Hermanos Rodríguez in Mexico City, as well as the Circuit of the Americas.

On 2 December 2019, it was announced by the WEC, that the 6 Hours of São Paulo would be cancelled, and replaced by the Lone Star Le Mans at Circuit of the Americas, to be held from 22–23 February 2020, with the race being 6 hours long. The date was moved back from the Interlagos round's original 1 February date, due to the Super Bowl LIV being held on the same date, while the Formula E championship was scheduled to hold the Mexico City ePrix on the weekend of 14–15 February.

Entry list 

On 3 February 2020, it was announced that Team LNT had withdrawn from the entry list for the event due to necessary maintenance that the cars needed. The team will return to the grid at Sebring however. The withdrawal of both Ginetta G60-LT-P1s meant that the car count was now 29. 

The DragonSpeed team who were initially denied entry for the COTA round were now able to secure a spot in the COTA round. The team, a day later, confirmed their driver line-up to be that of their 24 Hours of Daytona entry; Colin Braun, Ben Hanley, who also drives for Team LNT, and Henrik Hedman.

Furthermore, on the 5 February 2020, ex-Corvette Racing drivers Jan Magnussen and Mike Rockenfeller will return to the team for two rounds of the 2019-20 season as a duo in the new Corvette C8.R. The two will also compete in the round at Sebring International Raceway in March. 

German driver Laurents Hörr will replace David Heinemeier Hansson in the No. 56 Team Project 1 Porsche for the rest of the season.

These additional entries bring the total amount back to the maximum 31; 3 LMP1s, 9 LMP2s, 7 LMGTE Pro cars and 11 in LMGTE Am.

Qualifying

Results 
Pole Position winners in each class are in bold

Race

Results
The minimum number of laps for classification (70% of the overall winning car's race distance) was 132 laps.

References 

Lone Star|2019–20 FIA World Endurance Championship season
Lone
Lone Star Le Mans
Lone Star Le Mans